Andrés Ledesma (born 7 January 1980) is a Colombian boxer. He competed in the men's featherweight event at the 2000 Summer Olympics.

References

1980 births
Living people
Colombian male boxers
Olympic boxers of Colombia
Boxers at the 2000 Summer Olympics
People from Bolívar Department
Featherweight boxers